The Club at Snoqualmie Ridge is a private golf club in the northwest United States, located in Snoqualmie, Washington,  east of Seattle, at the foothills of the Cascade Range.

Designed by Jack Nicklaus, the championship golf course opened in 1999 and was formerly a member of the Tournament Players Club network operated by the PGA Tour. Since 2005, it has hosted the Boeing Classic, a 54-hole PGA Tour Champions event in late August.

When the project was initially announced  in 1986, the course was to be designed by Rees Jones.

The club left the TPC network in 2016 and was renamed "The Club at Snoqualmie Ridge" in December.
Arcis Equity of Dallas purchased the course in 2013 from BrightStar Golf Group of Carlsbad, California, who had owned it for five years; the original owner was 

The course record is 60 (–12), set by Kevin Sutherland in 2018, during the second round of the Boeing Classic on Saturday,  The previous record of 61 was carded by Scott Simpson twelve years earlier, in the second round of the 2006 edition.  It was equaled the next day by Tom Jenkins, but both finished one shot out of the playoff, in a five-way tie

Scorecard

References

External links
 
 Boeing Classic.com
 Boeing Classic coverage on Champions Tour's official site
 Nicklaus.com – The Club at Snoqualmie Ridge

Golf clubs and courses in Washington (state)
Buildings and structures in King County, Washington
1999 establishments in Washington (state)
Sports venues completed in 1999